In mathematics, a  space, where  is a real number, is a specific type of metric space. Intuitively, triangles in a  space are "slimmer" than corresponding "model triangles" in a standard space of constant curvature .

Originally, Aleksandrov called these spaces “ domain”.
The terminology  was coined by Mikhail Gromov in 1987 and is an acronym for Élie Cartan, Aleksandr Danilovich Aleksandrov and Victor Andreevich Toponogov (although Toponogov never explored curvature bounded above in publications).

Definitions

For a real number , let  denote the unique complete simply connected surface (real 2-dimensional Riemannian manifold) with constant curvature .

Let  be a geodesic metric space, i.e. a metric space for which every two points  can be joined by a geodesic segment, an arc length parametrized continuous curve , whose length

is precisely .

A (not-necessarily-geodesic) metric space  is said to be a space with curvature  if every point of  has a geodesically convex  neighbourhood. A space with curvature  may be said to have non-positive curvature.

Examples

 Any  space  is also a  space for all . In fact, the converse holds: if  is a  space for all , then it is a  space.
 The -dimensional Euclidean space  with its usual metric is a  space. More generally, any real inner product space (not necessarily complete) is a  space; conversely, if a real normed vector space is a  space for some real , then it is an inner product space.
 The -dimensional hyperbolic space  with its usual metric is a  space, and hence a  space as well.
 The -dimensional unit sphere  is a  space.
 More generally, the standard space  is a  space. So, for example, regardless of dimension, the sphere of radius  (and constant curvature ) is a  space.
 The closed subspace  of  given by  equipped with the induced length metric is not a  space for any .
(This does not hold for negative arguments.)

Hadamard spaces

As a special case, a complete CAT(0) space is also known as a Hadamard space; this is by analogy with the situation for Hadamard manifolds. A Hadamard space is contractible (it has the homotopy type of a single point) and, between any two points of a Hadamard space, there is a unique geodesic segment connecting them (in fact, both properties also hold for general, possibly incomplete, CAT(0) spaces). Most importantly, distance functions in Hadamard spaces are convex: if  are two geodesics in X defined on the same interval of time I, then the function  given by

is convex in t.

Properties of CAT(k) spaces

Let  be a  space. Then the following properties hold:

 It follows from these properties that, for  the universal cover of every  space is contractible; in particular, the higher homotopy groups of such a space are trivial.  As the example of the -sphere  shows, there is, in general, no hope for a  space to be contractible if .

Surfaces of non-positive curvature
In a region where the curvature of the surface satisfies , geodesic triangles satisfy the CAT(0) inequalities of comparison geometry, studied by Cartan, Alexandrov and Toponogov, and considered later from a different point of view by Bruhat and Tits; thanks to the vision of Gromov, this characterisation of non-positive curvature in terms of the underlying metric space has had a profound impact on modern geometry and in particular geometric group theory. Many results known for smooth surfaces and their geodesics, such as Birkhoff's method of constructing geodesics by his curve-shortening process or van Mangoldt and Hadamard's theorem that a simply connected surface of non-positive curvature is homeomorphic to the plane, are equally valid in this more general setting.

Alexandrov's comparison inequality

The simplest form of the comparison inequality, first proved for surfaces by Alexandrov around 1940, states that

is a convex function, i.e.

Taking geodesic polar coordinates with origin at  so that , convexity is equivalent to

,
where  corresponds to the unit vector .

See also 

 Cartan–Hadamard theorem

References

 

 
 
 
 
 

Metric geometry